Rendalen is a municipality in Innlandet county, Norway. It is located in the traditional district of Østerdalen. The administrative centre of the municipality is the village of Bergset. Other villages in the municipality include Hanestad, Otnes, Sjølisand, Unset, Åkre, and Åkrestrømmen.

The  municipality is the 13th largest by area out of the 356 municipalities in Norway. Rendalen is the 294th most populous municipality in Norway with a population of 1,722.

General information
The municipality of Rendalen was established on 1 January 1965 when the old municipalities of Ytre Rendal (population: 1,913) and Øvre Rendal (population: 1,629) were merged. On 1 January 1984, the unpopulated Spekedalen valley was transferred from Tynset Municipality to Rendalen.

Name
The municipality is named after the Rendalen valley which is located within the municipality. The river Rena runs through the valley and it is not known if the valley was named after the river or if the river was named after the valley. A nearby mountain Renafjellet also has a similar name.

Coat of arms
The coat of arms was granted on 2 June 1989. The arms show two white or silver reindeer on a blue background. They symbolize the importance of reindeer farming in the community. The arms are a canting since the name Rendalen is derived from the word for reindeer. The two heads represent the two former municipalities of Øvre Rendal and Ytre Rendal which were merged in 1965 to form this municipality. The arms were designed by the artist Arvid Sveen.

Churches
The Church of Norway has four parishes within the municipality of Rendalen. It is part of the Nord-Østerdal prosti (deanery) in the Diocese of Hamar.

Geography
The 11 largest municipalities are all in rural Northern Norway and they are followed by Ullensvang and Rendalen. Rendalen municipality is bordered on the northwest by the municipalities of Alvdal and Tynset, in the north by Tolga, in the east by Engerdal, in the south by Trysil and Åmot, and in the west by Stor-Elvdal.

Rendalen municipality encompasses most of the Rendalen valley, a side valley of the large Østerdalen valley which dominates Eastern Norway. In addition, the municipality encompasses the northern part of the lake Storsjøen as well as the lakes Sølensjøen, Galtsjøen, Harrsjøen, and Lomnessjøen. The mountains Elgspiggen and Sølen are in Rendalen as well. The rivers Glomma and Renaelva both flow through the municipality.

Government

The municipal council  of Rendalen is made up of 17 representatives that are elected to four year terms. The party breakdown of the council is as follows:

Mayor 
The mayors of Rendalen have included:
 
1965-1967: Erik Husfloen (Ap)
1968-1977: Kjell Borgen (Ap)
1978-1979: Otto Tobro (Ap)
1980-1991: Steinar Berget (Ap)
1992-1995: Sindre Undseth (Ap)
1995-2007: Erling Myhre (Sp)
2007-2019: Norvald Illevold (Ap)
2019–present: Linda Døsen (Ap)

Economy
The primary occupations are in farming and logging, but tourism is also important. The Renåfjellet mountain area provides for excellent alpine hiking.

Notable residents

 Johan Reinhardt (1778 in Rendalen – 1845) professor of zoology at Copenhagen University
 Gustav Storm (1845 in Rendalen – 1903) a Norwegian historian and academic
 Jacob Breda Bull (1853 in Rendalen – 1930) a Norwegian author, journalist and editor
 David P. Kvile (1861–1918) a teacher, farmer and politician; teacher in Øvre Rendal from 1885 
 Peder E. Vorum (1884–1970) an educator and politician, Mayor of Ytre Rendal from 1913 to 1934; joined Nasjonal Samling 1940, collaborated in WWII, convicted of treason in 1948
 Ottar E. Akre (1896 in Ytre Rendal – 1992) a Norwegian accordionist, composer, and educator
 Sigurd Akre-Aas (1897 in Ytre Rendal – 1968) a Norwegian fencer, competed at the 1924 and 1928 Summer Olympics
 Oddbjørn Hagen (1908 in Ytre Rendal – 1983) a Norwegian skier, at the 1936 Winter Olympics he won one gold in the Nordic combined and two silvers in cross-country skiing
 Kjell Borgen (1939–1996) politician, former Minister of Transport, secondary school teacher in Rendalen, 1962 to 1966
 Ola Otnes (born 1951 in Rendalen) a Norwegian actor 
 Guren Hagen, (Norwegian Wiki) (born 1959 in Rendalen) musician

International relations

Twin towns – Sister cities
Rendalen has sister city agreements with the following places:
 - Aalborg, Region Nordjylland, Denmark
 - Liperi, Itä-Suomi, Finland
 - Orsa, Dalarna County, Sweden

Media gallery

References

External links

Municipal fact sheet from Statistics Norway 
Municipal website 

 
Municipalities of Innlandet
Valleys of Innlandet
1965 establishments in Norway